Vlora International Airport (alternatively spelled Vlorë International Airport) is an airport under construction since 2021 in the Vjosa-Narta Protected Landscape, 10 km north of the city of Vlorë in Albania. This airport will be the third international airport in Albania after Tirana International Airport and Kukës International Airport.
The project also includes the construction of a marina and agri-tourism site as part of the airport.

History
On 17 January 2018, the Turkish-consortium that built the Istanbul Airport, offered to build Vlorë Airport in a regional project that also paves the way for Albania to set up its national flag carrier (Air Albania) and reduce current ticket prices. The Turkish joint venture consortium of Cengiz-Kolin-Limak-Mapa-Kalyon offered to build the airport as part of the assistance the Albanian government has been receiving from the Turkish government and Turkish Airlines. However, the Turkish consortium decided to withdraw from the initiative a year later.

In September 2019, a new project was unveiled by the Albanian Government consisting in the construction of a marina and retail complex including an agritourism site.

The tender for the construction of the airport was temporarily suspended by the Albanian government on 31 March 2020 due to the COVID-19 pandemic.

A consortium made up of Behgjet Pacolli's Mabco Constructions, the Turkish YDA Group and the Kosovar 2A Group Shpk was the winner of the international tender and the contract was signed on 20 April 2021. Prior to the commencement of the construction of the airport, environment and archaeological studies were carried out. The construction of the airport will take 36 months and the project includes the construction of a 3.2 km runway, hangar for aircraft maintenance and cargo service. The work for the construction of the airport was launched officially on 28 November 2021 with a completion target time of April 2024.

Environmental concerns
The building of the Vlora Airport inside the Vjosa-Narta Protected Area is in contradiction with national laws and international biodiversity protection conventions that Albania has ratified. The Vjosa-Narta Protected Landscape is a candidate for the Emerald site network, which provides shelter to more than 62 species of birds listed in the EU Birds directive.  The Bern Convention called on the Albanian Government to review the plans to build an airport inside the Vjosa-Narta Protected Area.
The new airport is planned to accommodate wide-body aircraft and will be the biggest airport in the country. It is expected to have a major impact on economic growth and tourism, but on the other hand, a grave negative impact on the biodiversity of the area as the airport will be located entirely in the Narta Lagoon, which is a protected area in Albania. Environmentalists have expressed their concern about the possible collision of airplanes with birds, as Narta Lagoon is a major breeding and living place of migratory birds.

See also
List of airports in Albania
Tirana International Airport Nënë Tereza
Kukës International Airport Zayed

References

External links
Vlora International Airport Project at Mabetex Official Website
Official website of Vlora International Airport

Airports in Albania
Vlorë
Buildings and structures in Vlorë
Proposed transport infrastructure in Albania